Tai is a surname in various cultures.

Arabic
Tai or al-Ta'i, at-Ta'i, also spelled al-Ta'i or at-Ta'iy, is an Arabic name. In ancient times it originated as a nisba indicating affiliation with the Tayy tribe.

Hatim al-Tai (Hatem ibn Abdellah ibn Sa'ad at-Ta'iy, died 578), Arab poet
Dawud Tai (Abu Solaiman Dawud ibn Nosair al-Ta’i, died 770s or 780s), Sufi mystic
Sultan Hashim Ahmad al-Tai (1945–2020), Iraqi Minister of Defense under Saddam Hussein
Ashraf Tai, Burmese-born Pakistani martial artist who states that he is a descendant of Hatim al-Tai

Chinese
Tái is the Pinyin romanisation of the Chinese surname written using the character . According to traditional stories recorded in the Shuowen Jiezi, it originated as a toponymic surname referring to the city by the same name.

Tai Chih-yuan (born 1965), Taiwanese comedian
Samuel Tai (born 1966), Hong Kong-born Taiwan singer

Tái is also the Pinyin romanisation of the Chinese surname written using the character .

Tai Xiaohu (born 1998), Chinese diver

Tai may also be the Wade-Giles transcription of Dai; see that page for people with that Chinese surname.

People
Tai Beng Hai (born 1965), Malaysian field hockey player
Tai Chen-yao (1948-2017), Taiwanese politician
Tai Cheuk-yin, Hong Kong politician
Tai Chih-yuan (born 1965), Taiwanese comedian
Tai Hung-hsu (born 1987), Taiwanese football skier
Tai An Khang (born 1994), Malaysian badminton player
Tai Tak-fung (born 1948), Chinese political figure
Tai Tzu-ying (born 1994), Taiwanese badminton player
Tai William (born 1997), Taiwanese speed skater
Tai Xiaohu (born 1998), Chinese diver

Japanese
People with these surnames include:

Ichiro Tai, Japanese electrical engineer
Miyuki Tai (born 1980), Japanese badminton player
, Japanese voice actor

Korean

Tai is an alternative spelling of the Korean surname Tae. In a study by the National Institute of the Korean Language based on 2007 application data for South Korean passports, it was found that 28.5% of people with that surname spelled it in Latin letters as Tai in their passports, vs. 57.1% as Tae.

Other
António Taí (born 1948), Portuguese footballer
Eric Tai (born 1964), New Zealand actor of Tongan descent
Katherine Tai, American diplomat
Kobe Tai (born 1972), stage name of an American pornographic actress of Asian descent, changed from Coby Ty to sound "more ethnic" for marketing purposes
Daniel Tai (born 1977), New Zealand boxer
Jordan Tai (born 1982), New Zealand boxer and kickboxer
Soaeb Tai (born 1989), Indian cricketer

See also
Tai (disambiguation)
Tai (given name)

References